"Diamond Heart" is a song by British-Norwegian record producer and DJ Alan Walker, featuring Swedish singer-songwriter Sophia Somajo. The song was released on 28 September 2018 via MER Recordings. Two remixes were officially released, one by Syn Cole and one by Dzeko.

Background
The song was debuted performance at Tomorrowland 2017. And 'Diamond Heart' is a lyrically driven track.

Composition
Billboard mentioned: "Walker's bouncing rhythm and Sophia Somajo's bullet-proof performance comes through slightly tropical."

Critical reception
We Rave You commented: "Atmospheric from the very first moments, the track centres around Somajo’s haunting vocals which effortlessly intertwine with the track’s addictive". EDM Sauce say: "Walker's breakthrough hit for a happy, catchy spirit that will hitting repeat as soon as this song ends."

Music video
The video “Diamond Heart” is the third and the final chapter of the World of Walker trilogy. And directed by Kristian Berg.

Charts

Weekly charts

Year-end charts

Certifications

References

2018 songs
Alan Walker (music producer) songs
Songs written by Alan Walker (music producer)
Songs written by Thomas Troelsen
Songs written by Gunnar Greve
Songs written by Mood Melodies